This is a timeline of the Insurgency in Northeast India, an ongoing armed conflict between the separatist rebels  and the Indian government.

Timeline of the conflict

2010s

2010

2011

2012

2013

2014 

November 2014

 At least 50 people were killed and 80 injured after an attack by tribal guerrillas. The strike was in response to an offensive by India against the guerrillas.

2015 

 AFSPA was abolished in the state of Tripura, owing to the relatively peaceful situation there
 August-The NSCN(IM) and NSCN(K) insurgent groups of Nagaland signed a peace accord with the Indian government. Prime Minister Narenda Modi called the agreement "historic".

2016

2017 

 12 December –
 Two people (A father and son) were shot dead by ULFA militants.
 An encounter between the security forces and members of the Garo National Liberation Army were reported near the village of Nangalbibra, in South Garo Hills district. No casualties were reported in both sides, and the officers claim the presence of the rebels was for the establishment as a centre to extort money from coal quarries and trucks.
 14 December – A militant were killed in an encounter between militants of NDFB and security forces.

2018 

 AFSPA was abolished in Meghalaya.
 18 February – Four persons, including the NCP candidate Jonathone Nengminza Sangma, were killed and three others injured in an improvised explosive device blast in Meghalaya's East Garo Hills district, India.
 5 March – A rifleman of 13 Sikh Light Infantry was killed in an encounter with the National Socialist Council of Nagaland at Khoupum area in Manipur's Noney district.
 4 May – A police officer and a terrorist died in a shooting and grenade attack in Tinsukia district in the Indian state of Assam.
 9 May – Two members of the Border Security Force were killed and three civilians injured in a bomb explosion outside a BSF camp in the Imphal East district of Manipur.
 5 June – The Assam Rifles outpost at Lampong Sheanghah village in the Mon district of the Indian state of Nagaland was attacked by militants, leaving three security personnel injured.
 17 June – Four Assam Rifles personnel were killed in an ambush by militants of the National Socialist Council of Nagaland in Nagaland's Mon district, near the Indian-Myanmar border. Six other soldiers were injured in the incident, two of them seriously.

References 

Conflicts in 2015
Insurgency in Northeast India
Lists of armed conflicts in the 21st century